This is a list of both active and inactive Pro Wrestling Illustrated awards which are voted on by Pro Wrestling Illustrated (PWI) readers every year from 1972 onwards, expanding to more categories in later years.

Unlike other wrestling magazines and websites, PWI is largely a magazine written within the fictional realm of professional wrestling and the awards recognize this.

Active awards

Wrestler of the Year

The PWI Wrestler of the Year award recognizes the best professional wrestler of the year. Ric Flair has won the award a record six times, and remains the only wrestler with more than three wins; he also established the record for most consecutive wins with three from 1984 to 1986, with AJ Styles later tying that record in 2016-2018. Since 2020, female wrestlers have been included in this category.

Woman of the Year

The PWI Woman of the Year award recognized the best female professional wrestling personality of the year. Originally known as Girl Wrestler of the Year, it was rendered defunct in 1976 and its history would be subsumed into the current award when women have again bestowed their category in 2000. It was again abandoned in 2020, and several female wrestlers were nominated for Wrestler of the Year but the award was again reinstated in 2021. Trish Stratus has won this award a record four times. AJ Lee is the only wrestler to win the award three times consecutively. Mickie James is the only wrestler to have won the award competing for two different organizations.

Tag Team of the Year
The PWI Tag Team of the Year award recognizes the best tag team of the year. The Road Warriors (Animal & Hawk) have won a record four times. The New Day is the only trio to win the award.

Faction of the Year
The PWI Faction of the Year award recognized the best faction of the year. This award made its debut in 2021.

Match of the Year

The PWI Match of the Year award recognizes the best match of the year. Shawn Michaels has won the award a record eleven times; he had a four-year win streak from 1993 to 1996 and then a seven-year win streak from 2004 to 2010.

Feud of the Year
The PWI Feud of the Year award recognizes the best rivalry of the year, normally between two wrestlers but also between groups as well. Ric Flair vs. Lex Luger is tied with Vince McMahon vs. Stone Cold Steve Austin, each winning twice. Ric Flair, Vince McMahon, and Triple H have won this award four times individually. The Four Horsemen, The Authority, The Nexus, and Aces & Eights are the only stables to win the award.

Most Popular Wrestler of the Year

The PWI Most Popular Wrestler of the Year award recognizes the best face or heroic professional wrestler of the year. Sting and John Cena have won this award a record four times. Rob Van Dam is the only wrestler to win the award as a heel (villain). In 2019, Becky Lynch became the first woman to win the award.

Most Hated Wrestler of the Year

The PWI Most Hated Wrestler of the Year award typically recognizes the most effective heel (villainous) professional wrestler of the year. Triple H has won this award a record five times, with his fourth win as part of The Authority. In 2010, the award was given to a stable, The Nexus for the first time. Roman Reigns is the only wrestler to win this award while presented as a face (heroic character).

Comeback of the Year

The PWI  Comeback of the Year award, given yearly since 1992, recognizes the most impressive comeback by a professional wrestler during the year. Sting and Jeff Hardy have won this award a record three times each (Hardy's third win is shared with his brother Matt as part of the Hardy Boyz).

Most Improved Wrestler of the Year
The PWI Most Improved Wrestler of the Year award recognizes the most improved professional wrestler of the year.

Indie Wrestler of the Year
The PWI Indie Wrestler of the Year award recognizes the best wrestler who competes on the independent circuit.

Inspirational Wrestler of the Year

The PWI Inspirational Wrestler of the Year award recognizes the most inspirational professional wrestler of the year. The award has been given yearly since 1972, and in this time, Bob Backlund, Hulk Hogan, Eddie Guerrero, Jerry Lawler, Bayley, and Roman Reigns are the only people to have won the award more than once, with all six winning twice. Generally, the award is meant to go to a wrestler who overcomes great odds to achieve success in the ring, although it has also been awarded to wrestlers who overcome real-life hardships and struggles.

Rookie of the Year

The PWI Rookie of the Year award recognizes the best professional wrestler of the year who, in that year, had their first year in the business. As it is a rookie award, wrestlers can qualify only once.

Stanley Weston Award (Lifetime Achievement)
 
The PWI Stanley Weston Award recognizes lifetime achievement by a professional wrestling personality. It has been given yearly since 1981, and was originally known as the PWI'' Editor's Award. Beginning with the March 2003 year-end edition, the award was renamed in memory of PWI founder and longtime publisher Stanley Weston, who died in 2002. In 2020, PWI announced it would begin naming two winners per year.

Decade awards

2000s

2010s

Defunct awards

Midget Wrestler of the Year
The PWI Midget Wrestler of the Year award recognized the best midget wrestler of the year. This award became defunct in 1976.

Manager of the Year

The PWI Manager of the Year award recognized the best manager of the year. Bobby Heenan won a record four times. Lou Albano, J. J. Dillon, and Jim Cornette each won three times.

Announcer of the Year

The PWI'' Announcer of the Year award recognized the best announcer of the year. This award was only given in 1977.

See also
List of professional wrestling awards
List of Wrestling Observer Newsletter awards
Slammy Award

Notes

References
General

Specific

Awards
Professional wrestling-related lists
Professional wrestling awards
Awards established in 1972